The 2017–18 Superliga was the 62nd season of the Polish Superliga, the top men's handball league in Poland. A total of fourteen teams contested this season's league, which began on 1 September 2017 and concluded on 3 June 2018. 

PGE Vive Kielce won their 15th title of the Polish Champions.

Format
The competition format for the 2017–18 season consisted of 2 groups of eight teams each playing a total of 30 matches, half at home and half away, with the top 3 teams of each group qualifying directly for the quarterfinals. The teams ranked 4th and 5th play for a place in the quarterfinals.

Regular season
A victory over a team of the same group add 1 extra point.

Grenade Group

Orange Group

Results

Playoffs

First round

|}

Final round

Final standings

References

External links
 Official website 

Poland
Superliga
Superliga
Superliga
Superliga